Shariff Thabit Ramadhan (born 3 September 1988), better known by his stage name Darassa is a Tanzanian rapper, recognized for his 2016 hit song 'Muziki', featuring Ben Pol.

Career
Darassa music career started in 2014 when he released the song ‘Sikati Tamaa’. He then took a break from music. He returned in 2016 with a 'Utanipenda ' featuring Rich Mavoko and also released the ‘Muziki’ single featuring Ben Pol, which received massive airplay across East Africa. Once again, Darassa took a hiatus before emerging again in 2018.

Discography
Album
2020: Slave becomes a King
Singles
Proud of you ft Ali Kiba
I like it ft Sho Madjozi
Waiter ft Mr Burudani
Umeniroga ft Kassim Mganga
Nimetumwa Pesa
Loyalty ft Nandy & Marioo
Size yao ft Dogo Janja
Usiniletee shida ft Femi One
Blessings ft Abbah & Mr. T Touch
Hands Up ft Maua Sama
Lock me down ft Jaiva
My life ft Chibwa & Marisa
Utanitoa roho
Segedance ft Rich Mavoko
Shemeji ft Barakah The Prince
Hasso
Nikiondoka
Hater
Nana ft G Boy
Boss it ft Ben Pol

Other singles
Leo ft Jux
Muziki ft Ben Pol
Kama Utanipenda ft Rich Mavoko
Tumepoteza ft Maua Sama
Achia njia
Too much
Chanda chema ft Marioo
Tunaishi ft Ney wa Mitego
Hoya Hayo ft Mr. Blue
Inapepea ft Stamina
Watch me ft Godzilla
Shika ft Maua Sama

References

Living people
21st-century Tanzanian male singers
People from Dar es Salaam
1988 births
Tanzanian Bongo Flava musicians
Swahili-language singers